Dream.10: Welter Weight Grand Prix 2009 Final Round was a mixed martial arts event promoted by Fighting and Entertainment Group's mixed martial arts promotion Dream on July 20, 2009. Dream's welterweight division has a  weight limit.  The event was broadcast live in North America on HDNet.

Results

See also
 Dream (mixed martial arts)
 List of Dream champions
 2009 in DREAM

Notes
 An early report suggested that Joachim Hansen would defend his DREAM Light Weight Championship against Shinya Aoki at DREAM.10. 
 Three undercard bouts were announced for DREAM.10 during the intermission of DREAM.9. These bouts included Shinya Aoki versus Vítor Ribeiro, Melvin Manhoef versus Paulo Filho, and Katsunori Kikuno versus Andre Amade. Following a short promotional video, Shinya Aoki, Katsunori Kikuno, and Hayato Sakurai each entered the ring, and gave brief addresses to the audience. 
 After fulfilling a one-fight contract with Zuffa, LLC at UFC 99, Mirko Filipović was rumored to have re-signed with FEG for participation at DREAM.10. Siala-Mou "Mighty Mo" Siligia was rumored to be Filipovic's opponent on the card. However, the bout was scrapped after Zuffa Chairman Lorenzo Fertitta flew to Zagreb, Croatia to reopen contract negotiations with Filipovic.

Welterweight Grand Prix 2009 Bracket

Dream Welterweight Grand Prix Reserve Bouts:
 Tarec Saffiedine def.  Seichi Ikemoto at DREAM.10

References

Dream (mixed martial arts) events
2009 in mixed martial arts
Sport in Saitama (city)
Mixed martial arts in Japan
2009 in Japan